A series of 29 wildfires ignited across Southern California in December 2017. Six of the fires became significant wildfires, and led to widespread evacuations and property losses.

On December 5, Governor Jerry Brown declared a state of emergency for Ventura and Los Angeles Counties, followed by San Diego County on December 7; U.S. President Donald Trump subsequently declared a State of Emergency for California on December 8.

This swarm of wildfires was exacerbated by unusually powerful and long-lasting Santa Ana winds, as well as large amounts of dry vegetation, due to a then-far unusually dry rainy season thus far. They also occurred at the end of an unusually active and destructive wildfire season; the fires cost at least $3.5 billion (2018 USD) in damages, including $2.2 billion in insured losses and $300 million in fire suppression costs.

Wildfire maps

These maps depict the location and burn areas of some of the major wildfires.

Wildfires

Thomas Fire

The first report of the fire was at 6:26 p.m. on December 4 just north of Santa Paula, near Steckel Park and Thomas Aquinas College. Over the next  days, it advanced toward Ojai and had jumped Highway 33 and the Ventura River into the Rincon Oil Field area. By the evening of December 10, the Thomas Fire had reached  in size, becoming the fifth largest wildfire in modern California history, and the largest wildfire recorded in California during the month of December. There were multiple periods of time when the fire was advancing at a rate of over an acre a second. The Thomas Fire had also destroyed at least 794 structures while damaging 187 others, and cost at least $38.4 million to fight, becoming at least the 10th most destructive wildfire in California history. On December 13, the Thomas Fire's northwestern flank linked up with its southwestern flank, to the east of Carpinteria, enveloping an area containing Ojai and Lake Casitas. On December 19, the Thomas Fire reached , with 55% containment, surpassing the burn area of the Rush Fire in California to become the second-largest wildfire in modern California history.

On January 8–9, 2018, a winter storm struck California, bringing heavy rain to Southern California, and prompting mandatory evacuations in parts of Los Angeles, Santa Barbara, and Ventura Counties, over potential mudslides in areas affected by wildfires. At least  of rain fell over the two-day period, causing several major mudflows.

On January 12, 2018, the U.S. Forest Service declared the Thomas Fire 100 percent contained, at 281,893 acres. Afterward, Los Pedros National Forest officials continued monitoring the burn area of the Thomas Fire for hotspots. On March 22, 2018, InciWeb declared the Thomas Fire to be inactive and ceased providing updates. On June 1, 2018, the Thomas Fire was officially declared to be out, after more than two months in which no hotspots were detected within the perimeter of the burn area.

Creek Fire

Rye Fire

Little Mountain Fire
On December 5, at 12:28 p.m. PST, a wildfire broke out near University Parkway and Varsity Avenue in San Bernardino, just off Interstate 215. Students at Shandin Hills Middle School, on Little Mountain Drive, were also evacuated to Holcomb Elementary School. At 6:30 p.m. PST on the same day, the road closure and the evacuation orders had been lifted, though the Little Mountain area still remained closed off. Firefighters made progress on the fire that day, due to the weakening of the Santa Ana winds in the area beginning on the evening of December 5. During the evening of December 7, firefighters managed to extinguish the Little Mountain Fire, with no increase in acreage. Three civilians were burned by the fire, and were sent to a hospital for treatment. Three garages suffered minor damage, but no other structures were damaged by the fire. An investigation revealed that the fire was caused by an illegal cooking fire at a homeless camp.

Skirball Fire

Lilac Fire

Liberty Fire
The Liberty Fire was reported on December 7, at 1:14 p.m. PST, in Murrieta, in Riverside County. The Liberty Fire began as a vegetation fire. On the next day, with the improved weather conditions, firefighters made much more progress on the fire, bringing it to 90% containment. Late on December 9, the Liberty Fire was fully contained. Six structures and an outbuilding were destroyed by the fire.

Other wildfires
On December 7, a small brush fire broke out at Huntington Beach. The small brush fire burned  before it was fully contained on the same day, damaging a daycare center and a bank.

On December 7, 2 small brush fires broke out north of Buellton, in Santa Barbara County. The brush fires were collectively dubbed as the "Woodchopper Incident", with the first fire burning  and the second fire burning , before they were both contained later on the same day. The brush fires briefly caused the closure of Highway 101.

On December 8, at 9:30 a.m. PST, the Sweetwater Fire broke out in eastern San Diego County, south of Interstate 8 and just west of Japatul Valley Road, in Descanso.

On December 8, sometime before 12:56 p.m. PST, a small brush fire broke out in the El Sereno neighborhood of Los Angeles. Firefighters quickly extinguished the fire in a little over an hour, after the fire had burned .

On December 8, around 2:15 p.m. PST, a small brush fire broke out in Otay Mesa Canyon, in southern San Diego County. Firefighters were able to quickly extinguish the flames.

Early on December 11, firefighters quickly put out two small fires in Ocean Beach, San Diego. At around 2:15 a.m. PST, firefighters put out a burning fence in the 4,400 block of Santa Cruz Avenue, before responding to another shed fire less than a mile away, on Muir Avenue at 2:30 a.m., which damaged an RV. Arson investigators believe that the two fires are connected.

On December 11, two wildfires ignited along Interstate 805 in southern San Diego. The first fire ignited near Route 54 and Interstate 805, which was quickly extinguished. The second fire ignited at 2:07 p.m. PST at Interstate 805, to the south of Mesa College. This fire triggered the closing of the right two northbound lanes of Interstate 805 (on the side of the fire), and the fire burned 0.5 acre (0.20 ha) before firefighters were able to stop its spread.

On December 13, a small brush fire broke out in Oxnard, near Highway 101, just after 7:50 AM PST. The fire reached a quarter acre in size, before it was quickly contained within an hour.

During the night of December 15, just before 10:10 p.m. PST, a small brush fire broke out near Otay Valley Road, near a trucking facility in Otay Mesa, in southern San Diego County. The fire burned about 20 vehicles, before it was brought under control.

On December 19, at 8:20 a.m. PST, a small fire broke out at San Diego International Airport, near the 4000 block of Pacific Highway. The fire burned through a storage area and a couple of businesses, before firefighters were able to get the fire under control several hours later. The fire is estimated to have caused at least $1 million in damage.

Impacts
The December 2017 wildfires burned large areas of land and resulted in large property losses. In addition, the wildfires forced over 230,000 residents to evacuate their homes.

California Governor Jerry Brown declared a state of emergency in Ventura and Los Angeles Counties on December 5, and San Diego County on December 7. Los Angeles mayor Eric Garcetti declared a state of emergency for the city on December 6. U.S. President Donald Trump declared a state of emergency for the state of California on December 8.

Deaths
One civilian death was recorded, a 70-year-old woman, Virginia Pesola, from Santa Paula. In addition, Cory Iverson, a firefighter, perished while fighting the Thomas Fire. "This is a tragic reminder of the dangerous work that our firefighters do every day," said Los Padres National Forest Supervisor Teresa Benson in a release. "The Thomas Fire has many unprecedented conditions and complexities that challenge the already demanding job of fire suppression."

Aftermath

Mudslides

The wildfires destroyed many acres of forest. Due to the lack of trees' roots holding the soil together, the ground had reduced stability and was vulnerable to mud slides in heavy rain. In early January 2018, heavy rain was predicted for the American Southwest, causing flash flood watches and evacuations to be issued for portions of California affected by wildfires.

See also

2017 California wildfires
October 2017 Northern California wildfires
Blue Cut Fire (2016)
May 2014 San Diego County wildfires
October 2007 California wildfires
Cedar Fire (2003)
Santiago Canyon Fire
2018 Southern California mudflows

References

External links
2017 Statewide Fire Map, Google
SDSC WiFire Interactive Map — San Diego Supercomputer Center
2017 California fires information  — CalFire
Southern California's Worst Brush Fires

 

Wildfires in Los Angeles County, California
December 2017 events in the United States
Wildfires in San Bernardino County, California
Wildfires in San Diego County, California
Wildfires in Ventura County, California
Wildfires in Riverside County, California